"American Jesus is a single by punk rock band Bad Religion from their album Recipe for Hate.

American Jesus may also refer to:

 "American Jesus", a 2005 song by Dean Gray off the album American Edit
 American Jesus: How the Son of God Became a National Icon, a 2003 book by Stephen Prothero
 American Jesus (comics), a 2004 Dark Horse comic book series by Mark Millar and Peter Gross
 2013 American Jesus (film), with Frank Schaeffer, Keenan Smith, and others